Fritillaria biflora, the chocolate lily or mission bells, is a species of fritillary native to western California, US, and northern Baja California, Mexico. It occurs in the chaparral and woodlands ecoregion, often in serpentine soil formations and hillside grassland habitats.

Fritillaria biflora is a bulbous herbaceous perennial up to 60 cm tall. It is called "chocolate lily" because its flowers can resemble the color of chocolate, although sometimes they are greenish purple or yellowish green. Flowers bloom in March and April.

Fritillaria biflora should not be confused with Arthropodium strictum, which is also called "chocolate lily". In the latter, the scent is reminiscent of chocolate, rather than the color. The Kamchatka fritillary (F. camschatcensis) is sometimes also called "chocolate lily" in Alaska.

Varieties
Two varieties are recognized:

Fritillaria biflora var. biflora—leaves widely lanceolate, most of the species range
Fritillaria biflora var. ineziana Jeps., Fl. Calif. 1: 306 (1922).  -- leaves narrowly lanceolate, endangered taxon known only from one location in San Mateo County

See also
California chaparral and woodlands
California montane chaparral and woodlands
 List of plants known as lily

References and external links

Jepson Manual Treatment - Fritillaria biflora
USDA Plants Profile; Fritillaria biflora
Fritillaria biflora - U.C. Photo gallery
Theodore Payne Foundation: Chocolate Lily

biflora
Endemic flora of California
Natural history of the Santa Monica Mountains
Flora without expected TNC conservation status